The UEFA Women's Euro 2013 qualifying – Group 4 was contested by five teams competing for one spot for the final tournament.

Standings

Fixtures
All times are UTC+2.

Goalscorers
7 goals
 Eugénie Le Sommer

6 goals
 Kim Little

5 goals
 Marie-Laure Delie
 Gaëtane Thiney

4 goals

 Elodie Thomis
 Denise O'Sullivan
 Helen Lander

3 goals
 Jane Ross
 Natasha Harding

2 goals

 Camille Abily
 Louisa Nécib
 Jen Beattie
 Rachel Corsie
 Hayley Lauder
 Joanne Love

1 goal

 Sonia Bompastor
 Corine Franco
 Julie Morel
 Wendie Renard
 Léa Rubio
 Fiona O'Sullivan
 Moran Lavi
 Rhonda Jones
 Christie Murray
 Megan Sneddon
 Ciara Grant
 Áine O'Gorman
 Julie-Ann Russell
 Sophie Ingle
 Hannah Keryakoplis
 Amie Lea
 Jayne Ludlow
 Sarah Wiltshire

1 own goal

 Oshrat Eni (playing against France)
 Michal Ravitz (playing against Scotland)
 Ifeoma Dieke (playing against France)

References
Group 4

4
2011–12 in French women's football
2012–13 in French women's football
2011 in Scottish women's football
2012 in Scottish women's football
2011–12 in Welsh women's football
2012–13 in Welsh women's football
2011–12 in Israeli women's football
2012–13 in Israeli women's football
2011–12 in Republic of Ireland women's association football
2012–13 in Republic of Ireland women's association football
qual